is a species of flowering plant in the family Saxifragaceae that is endemic to Japan.

Taxonomy
The species was first described, as Chrysosplenium flagelliferum var. tosaense, by Japanese botanist Makino Tomitarō in 1901 (his 1892 mention of Chrysosplenium tosaense is a nomen nudum). In 1935, Sutō Chiharu elevated the variety to species rank. The specific epithet relates to the type locality, Nanokawa in Kōchi Prefecture (formerly Tosa Province).

Description

Distribution
Chrysosplenium tosaense is endemic to Japan, where it occurs from the Kantō region to the Chūgoku region of Honshū, Shikoku, and Kyūshū.

References

tosaense
Endemic flora of Japan
Species described in 1901